The arrondissement of Bayonne is an arrondissement of France in the Pyrénées-Atlantiques department in the Nouvelle-Aquitaine region. It has 122 communes.

Composition

The communes of the arrondissement of Bayonne, and their INSEE codes, are:

 Ahaxe-Alciette-Bascassan (64008)
 Ahetze (64009)
 Aïcirits-Camou-Suhast (64010)
 Aincille (64011)
 Ainhice-Mongelos (64013)
 Ainhoa (64014)
 Aldudes (64016)
 Amendeuix-Oneix (64018)
 Amorots-Succos (64019)
 Anglet (64024)
 Anhaux (64026)
 Arancou (64031)
 Arbérats-Sillègue (64034)
 Arbonne (64035)
 Arbouet-Sussaute (64036)
 Arcangues (64038)
 Arhansus (64045)
 Armendarits (64046)
 Arnéguy (64047)
 Aroue-Ithorots-Olhaïby (64049)
 Arraute-Charritte (64051)
 Ascain (64065)
 Ascarat (64066)
 Ayherre (64086)
 Banca (64092)
 Bardos (64094)
 Bassussarry (64100)
 La Bastide-Clairence (64289)
 Bayonne (64102)
 Béguios (64105)
 Béhasque-Lapiste (64106)
 Béhorléguy (64107)
 Bergouey-Viellenave (64113)
 Beyrie-sur-Joyeuse (64120)
 Biarritz (64122)
 Bidache (64123)
 Bidarray (64124)
 Bidart (64125)
 Biriatou (64130)
 Bonloc (64134)
 Boucau (64140)
 Briscous (64147)
 Bunus (64150)
 Bussunarits-Sarrasquette (64154)
 Bustince-Iriberry (64155)
 Cambo-les-Bains (64160)
 Came (64161)
 Çaro (64166)
 Ciboure (64189)
 Domezain-Berraute (64202)
 Espelette (64213)
 Estérençuby (64218)
 Etcharry (64221)
 Gabat (64228)
 Gamarthe (64229)
 Garris (64235)
 Guéthary (64249)
 Guiche (64250)
 Halsou (64255)
 Hasparren (64256)
 Hélette (64259)
 Hendaye (64260)
 Hosta (64265)
 Ibarrolle (64267)
 Iholdy (64271)
 Ilharre (64272)
 Irissarry (64273)
 Irouléguy (64274)
 Ispoure (64275)
 Isturits (64277)
 Itxassou (64279)
 Jatxou (64282)
 Jaxu (64283)
 Juxue (64285)
 Labets-Biscay (64294)
 Lacarre (64297)
 Lahonce (64304)
 Lantabat (64313)
 Larceveau-Arros-Cibits (64314)
 Larressore (64317)
 Larribar-Sorhapuru (64319)
 Lasse (64322)
 Lecumberry (64327)
 Lohitzun-Oyhercq (64345)
 Louhossoa (64350)
 Luxe-Sumberraute (64362)
 Macaye (64364)
 Masparraute (64368)
 Méharin (64375)
 Mendionde (64377)
 Mendive (64379)
 Mouguerre (64407)
 Orègue (64425)
 Orsanco (64429)
 Osserain-Rivareyte (64435)
 Ossès (64436)
 Ostabat-Asme (64437)
 Pagolle (64441)
 Saint-Esteben (64476)
 Saint-Étienne-de-Baïgorry (64477)
 Saint-Jean-de-Luz (64483)
 Saint-Jean-le-Vieux (64484)
 Saint-Jean-Pied-de-Port (64485)
 Saint-Just-Ibarre (64487)
 Saint-Martin-d'Arberoue (64489)
 Saint-Martin-d'Arrossa (64490)
 Saint-Michel (64492)
 Saint-Palais (64493)
 Saint-Pée-sur-Nivelle (64495)
 Saint-Pierre-d'Irube (64496)
 Sames (64502)
 Sare (64504)
 Souraïde (64527)
 Suhescun (64528)
 Uhart-Cize (64538)
 Uhart-Mixe (64539)
 Urcuit (64540)
 Urepel (64543)
 Urrugne (64545)
 Urt (64546)
 Ustaritz (64547)
 Villefranque (64558)

History

The arrondissement of Bayonne was created in 1800. At the January 2017 reorganisation of the arrondissements of Pyrénées-Atlantiques, it lost one commune to the arrondissement of Oloron-Sainte-Marie.

As a result of the reorganisation of the cantons of France which came into effect in 2015, the borders of the cantons are no longer related to the borders of the arrondissements. The cantons of the arrondissement of Bayonne were, as of January 2015:

 Anglet-Nord
 Anglet-Sud
 La Bastide-Clairence
 Bayonne-Est
 Bayonne-Nord
 Bayonne-Ouest
 Biarritz-Est
 Biarritz-Ouest
 Bidache
 Espelette
 Hasparren
 Hendaye
 Iholdy
 Saint-Étienne-de-Baïgorry
 Saint-Jean-de-Luz
 Saint-Jean-Pied-de-Port
 Saint-Palais
 Saint-Pierre-d'Irube
 Ustaritz

References

Bayonne